Douglas James Noel Wanstall  (22 November 1899 - 5 October 1974) was an English Anglican priest who was the Archdeacon of Malta in the Church of England Diocese in Europe from 1964 to 1971.

Wanstall was educated at Keble College, Oxford, and Ely Theological College. He was  ordained in 1927 and, after a  curacy at St Philip's Kensington, he became a chaplain in the Royal Navy. He was later the chaplain of All Saints' Church, Rome, before his appointment as an archdeacon.

References

Alumni of Ely Theological College
Alumni of Keble College, Oxford
Archdeacons of Malta
20th-century Maltese Anglican priests
Royal Navy chaplains
1899 births
1974 deaths